Reginald Jordan Perry (born March 21, 2000) is an American professional basketball player for the Motor City Cruise of the NBA G League. He played college basketball for the Mississippi State Bulldogs.

High school career
Perry attended Thomasville High School in Thomasville, Georgia. In his senior season, he averaged 22 points and 11 rebounds per game, earning Georgia Class 2A Player of the Year honors and leading Thomasville to its first state championship. In March 2018, Perry played in the McDonald's All-American Game.

Recruiting
On August 17, 2016, Perry committed to play college basketball for Arkansas, but in the following July, he decommitted from the program. On July 17, 2017, he committed to Mississippi State. Perry was considered a five-star recruit by Rivals and a four-star recruit by ESPN and 247Sports.

College career
As a freshman at Mississippi State, Perry averaged 9.7 points and 7.2 rebounds per game. On February 23, 2019, he scored a career-high 21 points, including 17 in the second half, against South Carolina.
After the season, Perry declared for the 2019 NBA draft and attended the draft combine but withdrew from the draft to return to the Bulldogs. On November 5, 2019, in his sophomore season opener, he recorded 13 points, seven rebounds and three assists in a win over FIU. At the conclusion of the regular season, Perry was named to the First Team All-SEC. As a sophomore, Perry averaged 17.4 points and 10.1 rebounds per game. After the season he declared for the 2020 NBA draft.

Professional career

Brooklyn Nets (2020–2021)
On November 18, 2020, Perry was drafted by the Los Angeles Clippers with the 57th overall pick in the 2020 NBA draft. He was subsequently traded to the Brooklyn Nets on November 19. On November 27, Perry signed with the Nets. On December 19, his contract was converted to a two-way contract. Under the deal, he would split time between the Nets and their NBA G League affiliate, the Long Island Nets. On January 29, 2021, Perry recorded his first career double-double with 10 points and 11 rebounds in the Nets' 147–125 win over the Oklahoma City Thunder.

Raptors 905 / Portland Trail Blazers / Indiana Pacers (2021–2022)
On September 21, 2021, Perry signed with the Toronto Raptors. On October 13, Perry was waived by the Raptors. He joined the Raptors 905 as an affiliate player.

On December 28, 2021, Perry signed a 10-day contract with the Portland Trail Blazers, and at the conclusion of his 10-day deal, he rejoined Raptors 905.

On February 4, 2022, Perry signed a 10-day contract with the Indiana Pacers, rejoining Raptors 905 on February 14.

On March 30, Perry signed a second 10-day contract with Portland and on April 9, he signed for the rest of the season.

Raptors 905 (2022–2023)
Perry joined the Los Angeles Clippers for the 2022 NBA Summer League. After not making the final roster for the Toronto Raptors, he re-joined the Raptors 905.

Motor City Cruise (2023–present)
On February 24, 2023, Perry was traded to the Motor City Cruise.

National team career
Perry joined the United States national under-19 team at the 2019 FIBA Under-19 World Cup in Heraklion, Greece. On July 5, 2019, he led all scorers with 28 points and eight rebounds in a 95–80 quarterfinal win over Russia. In seven games, Perry averaged 13.1 points, 7.9 rebounds, and 1.4 steals per game, leading the United States to a gold medal. He was named tournament MVP and joined teammate Tyrese Haliburton on the All-Star Five.

Personal life
Perry's father Al Perry played basketball for Mississippi State in the mid-1970s. He recorded 510 career assists, currently the third-most in program history.

Career statistics

NBA

Regular season

|-
| style="text-align:left;"| 
| style="text-align:left;"| Brooklyn
| 26 || 0 || 8.1 || .410 || .190 || .769 || 2.8 || .5 || .2 || .2 || 3.0
|-
| style="text-align:left;"| 
| style="text-align:left;"| Portland
| 9 || 1 || 19.7 || .500 || .188 || .600 || 5.1 || 1.3 || 1.0 || .7 || 10.0
|-
| style="text-align:left;"| 
| style="text-align:left;"| Indiana
| 1 || 0 || 10.0 || 1.000 ||  ||  || 1.0 || .0 || .0 || .0 || 2.0
|- class="sortbottom"
| style="text-align:center;" colspan="2"|Career
| 36 || 1 || 11.1 || .459 || .189 || .679 || 3.3 || .7 || .4 || .3 || 4.7

Playoffs

|-
| style="text-align:left;"| 2021
| style="text-align:left;"| Brooklyn
| 5 || 0 || 4.4 || .538 || .400 ||  || 1.2 || .2 || .2 || .0 || 3.2

College

|-
| style="text-align:left;"|2018–19
| style="text-align:left;"|Mississippi State
| 34 || 18 || 23.9 || .502 || .282 || .716 || 7.2 || .6 || .6 || .7 || 9.7
|-
| style="text-align:left;"|2019–20
| style="text-align:left;"|Mississippi State
| 31 || 31 || 31.1 || .500 || .324 || .768 || 10.1 || 2.3 || .8 || 1.2 || 17.4
|- class="sortbottom"
| style="text-align:center;" colspan="2"|Career
| 65 || 49 || 27.3 || .501 || .309 || .748 || 8.6 || 1.4 || .7 || .9 || 13.4

References

External links

 Mississippi State Bulldogs bio
 USA Basketball bio

2000 births
Living people
21st-century African-American sportspeople
African-American basketball players
American expatriate basketball people in Canada
American men's basketball players
Basketball players from Georgia (U.S. state)
Brooklyn Nets players
Indiana Pacers players
Long Island Nets players
Los Angeles Clippers draft picks
Mississippi State Bulldogs men's basketball players
People from Thomasville, Georgia
Portland Trail Blazers players
Power forwards (basketball)
Raptors 905 players
United States men's national basketball team players